Leket Israel, The National Food Bank, a registered nonprofit Israel-based charity, is the leading food rescue organization in Israel, serving 175,000+ needy people weekly. Leket Israel rescues surplus agricultural produce and collects excess cooked meals for redistribution to the needy throughout Israel via its network of 200+ nonprofit organization (NPO) partners.

Goals and objectives
The concept of Leket or "gleanings" derives from the Torah, ( and ), which specifies that ears of grain that fall from the reaper's hand or the sickle while being gathered during the harvest must be left for the poor (along with other agricultural gifts to the poor, as specified in the Torah and elaborated upon in tractate Pe'ah of the Talmud).

"I think that at a very basic level, it's a very Jewish value to be appalled by food waste," says Joseph Gitler, founder and director of Leket Israel.  Some farmers find it unprofitable to harvest all their produce while others cannot pick their entire crop before it begins to rot. In both cases, tens of thousands of tons of fresh fruits and vegetables are wasted each year. Israeli farmers invite Leket Israel to harvest their fields and to give the produce to needy people around the country. More than 40,000 volunteers took part in Project Leket in 2011. In addition,  20 Arab women were employed with full wages and benefits to assist in the picking. Through its activities,  Leket Israel promotes the idea of peaceful co-existence. "We had an organization that had 25 employees, all Jewish, and suddenly, we have 20 Israeli-Arab employees, and it’s been a very positive experience," says Gitler.

Former Israeli Prime Minister Ariel Sharon allowed  Leket Israel volunteers to pick oranges from his 15-dunam orchard in Ramot HaShavim near Kfar Saba. He was approached by the organization after one of its scouts spotted the unharvested fruit.

Researchers have found that  more than one-third of Israeli children live below the poverty line. Many children attend school without eating a nourishing breakfast or bringing lunch from home.

In 2006, Hands on Tzedakah, a public charity based in Boca Raton, Florida, approached Leket Israel to create a program to provide school children with a minimum of one healthy meal per day.

Leket Israel volunteers prepare and deliver more than 4,500 mid-morning meals to students at 70 schools around Israel. Each school day, the children receive a freshly baked roll filled with hummus, cream cheese, yellow cheese, or tuna, and a fresh fruit or vegetable. "This is the kind of program that builds and brings together all segments of the community," according to Shimon Pepper, executive director of the Rockland County, New York Jewish Federation.

History
In 2003, the first National Insurance Institute Report was released revealing that 25% of the Israeli population was living in poverty and that most suffered from some level of food insecurity, meaning not knowing where one’s next meal was coming from. Joseph Gitler, then a recent immigrant to Israel, started reaching out to nearby nonprofits and discovered that most of them were spending a large percentage of their budgets on purchasing food. Meanwhile, caterers were throwing out an exorbitant amount of food at the end of events. Mr. Gitler offered to pick up the surplus food from the catering halls and deliver it to the nonprofits thereby rescuing the food from destruction and at the same time, providing the food to those in need. This was the first step in creating what was then known as Table to Table.

In 2010, Table to Table (established in 2003) merged with the Leket Food Bank (established in 2007) and became Leket Israel.  Today, serving as the country's National Food Bank and largest food rescue network, Leket Israel's primary mission is to lead the safe, effective, and efficient collection and distribution of surplus nutritious food in Israel that would have otherwise been destroyed, redistributing the food to a network of 200 partner NPOs serving over 175,000 needy Israelis each week. As an umbrella organization, Leket Israel also works to support its NPO partners through nutrition education, food safety, and capacity building assistance.  NPOs include soup kitchens, community based organizations supplying food packages to the needy, centers for the elderly, shelters and after-school programs for youth at risk, among others.  Leket Israel mobilizes 50,000 volunteers a year in its food rescue programs, and is playing a crucial role in raising public awareness to the issues of nutritional insecurity, food waste and the environment, and the importance of balanced nutrition.

Leket Israel maintains the greatest logistical and human resource capacity of any single food provision agency in the country working to alleviate the problem of nutritional insecurity through the rescue and redistribution of surplus, nutritious food.  No other organization in Israel rescues food on a national level from hotels and caterers or works with farmers to glean produce from fields.  The food provisions offer crucial support to Leket Israel’s network of 200+ NPOs, helping them collectively reduce food costs by tens of millions of dollars a year, while expanding the range of fresh food provisions provided to their needy clientele.

In 2018, with the help of more than 47,000 volunteers, Leket Israel: (a) rescued, sourced, and distributed a total of 37,100,000 lbs. of agricultural produce, prepared meals, and other nutritious food to the needy; (b) cultivated, in partnership with farmers, 3,308,000 lbs. of field crops as part of a supplement to rescued food; (c) delivered 70 four-part nutrition workshops on healthy eating on a limited budget; (d) undertook hundreds of site visits to partner NPOs; and (e) invested $110,000 in capacity building funds to help NPOs upgrade basic infrastructure and improve food safety.

Food Donation Act

In October 2018, after 10 years of intensive work, and for the first time in Israel, the Food Donation Act passed in the Knesset plenum. Led by MK Uri Maklev with support from MKs Eli Elalouf, Moshe Gafni, Yechiel 'Hilik' Bar, Orly Levi Abekasis, Shuli Mualem and Mordechai Yogev, in cooperation with Leket Israel.  The Food Donation Act, similar to the United States Bill Emerson Act, absolves food donors, non-profit organizations and staff and volunteers at the non-profit organizations from criminal and civil liability, provided they adhere to food safety requirements set forth by the Ministry of Health.  Israel is one of only seven countries in the world (US, Australia, Canada, New Zealand, Argentina and the UK) who have similar legislation, which encourages the collection of excess food and protects the donors and organizations that distribute it.

Awards and recognition
Leket Israel has received or been recognized with the following prizes, awards, or titles:

Midot Seal of Effectiveness (2011-2021)
Greenhouse Energy Efficient Certified (2015)
Bonei Zion Prize 2014 (Category of “Community” awarded to Leket Israel Founder)
Official Israeli representative of the Global Foodbanking Network (Inducted 2011)
Presidential Citation Recipient (Awarded 2011)

Government Partnerships

As an Israeli charity, Leket Israel does not receive any significant government funding.  Of its 2019 estimated organization budget only 6.4% is expected to be funded by government sources and is allocated specifically to two new government subsidized initiatives.  The first is a joint project between the Ministry of Agriculture and Leket Israel, with Leket Israel tasked to provide workshops on proper nutrition and agricultural surplus for the Bedouin community in the Negev. The second is a project of the National Food Security Initiative, operated in cooperation with Leket Israel and Eshel Jerusalem-Chabad, whereby reloadable cards worth NIS 500 are distributed to thousands of families suffering from severe food insecurity. Leket Israel is responsible for assembling and providing parcels of surplus rescued produce which are then purchased with a portion of the reloadable cards.

Programs

Leket to Table: Meal Rescue
Leket Israel rescues surplus hot meals and prepared food from 300 suppliers including hotels, army bases, corporate cafeterias, and others, providing a crucial daily source of nutrition to thousands of Israel’s needy. In 2019, an estimated 2.4 million meals (meat and two side dishes) will be collected and redistributed to 80+ NPO partners throughout the country (an average of 46,000+ hot meals weekly) including soup kitchens, homeless shelters, last chances schools, and others.

Project Leket: Gleaning Initiative
Project Leket, Leket Israel’s flagship gleaning initiative, was established in 2005 to prevent the paradoxical waste of fruits and vegetables, in the face of significant levels of poverty and hunger in the country. Through the program, during 2019 Leket Israel’s staff and volunteers will rescue from fields, orchards, and packing houses over 35 million lbs. of fruits and vegetables slated by farmers for destruction (673,000 lbs. weekly). The project provides tens of thousands of Israel's poor with access to an important source of nutrition they could not otherwise afford. 
Project Leket was inspired by the Bible, which states: "When you reap your harvest in your field and forget a sheaf in the field, you shall not go back to get it; it shall be left for the stranger, the orphan, and the widow, so that the Lord your God may bless you in all your undertakings."

Self-Growing Initiative

In 2011, Leket Israel established a Self Growing Initiative to supplement that which is unavailable through rescue.   The project currently operates from two sites, (a) Moshav Nahalal in the Jezreel Valley where Leket Israel leases 35 acres of land and (b) Binyamina in the Hof Carmel region where Leket Israel owns 10 acres of land, including 5 acres of greenhouses.  Together, the two sites with the support of 20,000 volunteer harvesters, produces up to 1,500 tons (3.3 million lbs) of 8-10 highly nutritious vegetables annually.

Sandwich for School Kids Project
Sandwich for School Kids Project provides 7,800 volunteer prepared sandwiches daily to disadvantaged school children in over 100 schools throughout Israel.

Manufactured Food
Leket Israel rescues a weekly average of 22 tons of dairy, baked, dried, and frozen goods from 25 corporate partners, such as Supersol, Angel Bakeries, and Tara Dairy, who donate tens of thousands of perishable food items nearing their expiry dates and manufactured goods that were overproduced, packaged incorrectly, or cannot be sold commercially.

Purchasing Cooperative for Nonprofits
Leket's purchase cooperative for nonprofits provides savings up to 25% off of nonprofit organizations' food budgets.

Nutrition for Life Program
One of the primary tenets of Leket Israel is its focus on supplying healthy, nutritious food. Leket Israel’s Nutrition and Food Safety Department runs nutrition workshops to underprivileged communities throughout Israel. The workshops train participants on how to eat healthy on a limited budget, how to incorporate more fruits and vegetables into their daily diets and offers hands on food preparation activities for the participants. The workshops are run by licensed dieticians and offered in four languages, Hebrew, Russian, Arabic and Amharic.

In 2018, Leket Israel began a new program of Parent-Child workshops, working with groups of parents and their children to teach them important tools for eating healthy as a family, trying new fruits and vegetables, sitting down as a unit for dinner and the importance of eating breakfast.

Capacity Building Assistance Program for Nonprofits
Due to Leket Israel’s stringent food safety regulations, inspections of the NPO partners are done on a regular basis to ensure that all food donated is being handled in a secure way. In order to maintain a high level of food safety, Leket Israel assists NPOs by providing capital for capacity building and infrastructure improvement projects, and often includes the purchase of such items as industrial refrigerators and ovens, lifting jacks, shelving units, and other equipment.

See also

 List of food banks

References

External links

Charities based in Israel
Food banks
Volunteer organizations in Israel
Jewish relief organizations